The Hôtel Hermitage Monte-Carlo is a palace style Belle Époque in the heart of Monaco on the French Riviera . It belongs to the Société des bains de mer de Monaco. It was built in 1890 and 1896 the architect Nicolas Marquet with the participation of Gustave Eiffel.

Location 
The Hotel Hermitage Monte-Carlo is overlooking the Monaco Harbor and the Mediterranean Sea. It is classified as Monument.

It is part of the elite palaces in Monaco with the Hôtel de Paris Monte-Carlo, the Monte-Carlo Beach and Monte-Carlo Bay Hotel & Resort.

The lobby has been designed by Gustave Eiffel.

Features 
 The Hermitage Hotel belongs to the Société des bains de mer de Monaco
 278 rooms including 35 suites and junior suites and 8 suites Exclusive (Monte-Carlo Diamond Suites)
 A restaurant with panoramic terrace: Yannick Alléno à l’Hôtel Hermitage Monte-Carlo, Michelin 1-star
 A banquet hall closed: the Salle Belle Epoque (430 m2)
 8 flexible meeting rooms
 The Jardin d'Hiver (Winter garden) with its cupola signed Gustave Eiffel
 Lobby-bar: the Limùn Bar
 A piano bar
 Direct access to Thermes Marins de Monte-Carlo (SPA)

See also 
 Monte Carlo

References

Hotels in Monaco
Palaces in Monaco
1896 establishments in Monaco
Hotels established in 1896
Hotel buildings completed in 1896
The Leading Hotels of the World
Belle Époque